Khattar may refer to:

People

 Ishaan Khattar, Indian actor
 Jagdish Khattar, Indian bureaucrat and business executive
 Manohar Lal Khattar, Indian politician
Nasri Khattar, Lebanese architect, creator of the Unified Arabic typeface
 Rajesh Khattar, Indian actor
 Sat Pal Khattar, Singaporean lawyer

Other
 Khattar (clan)